The Florida Classic  is the annual college football rivalry game between Bethune–Cookman University and Florida A&M University. The game has been televised nationally by ESPN Classic as a part of a multi-year contract with the Mid-Eastern Athletic Conference (MEAC), which had been both schools' home conference until their July 2021 departure for the Southwestern Athletic Conference (SWAC). The game is operated by Florida Citrus Sports, a non-profit group that also organizes the Cheez-It Bowl and Citrus Bowl. The Classic has approximately a $31 million impact on Orlando's economy; it was the largest MEAC conference football game before the schools left for the SWAC, and remains the largest Division I FCS football game in Florida.

History

Florida A&M won the first Florida Classic game in 1978, 27–17, overcoming a 17–0 halftime deficit. The team went on to win the inaugural NCAA Division I-AA championship. Bethune–Cookman made the series competitive starting in 1973, winning 11 of their 14 series victories during that span, including a 58–52 overtime win in 2004, which was the first-ever three-peat for the ‘Cats in the overall series, which dates back to the 1920s. Florida A&M holds an 18–10 edge in the meetings since the instate rivalry moved from a home-and-home scenario to an annual neutral site game in Tampa Stadium in 1978.

The two schools went through a two-year hiatus in 1983 and 1984, when they could not agree on a playing site, but public pressure from alumni, fans and state officials brought them back to the negotiating table and they resumed the series in 1985. Bethune–Cookman won the rivalry renewal game, 31–27 in 1985.

The 1997–2007 games saw the Florida Classic revived to the point that it overshadowed the drawing power of the Bayou Classic in New Orleans, between Grambling and Southern University in terms of attendance. In 1998, 66,245 packed the Florida Citrus Bowl Stadium for the game which determined the 1998 MEAC Championship and postseason invitations. In 1999, the game drew 70,125 fans to Orlando, the sixth-largest football event ever held in the Orlando Citrus Bowl Stadium. The 2000 MEAC title game drew 70,719 to see a 31–28 thriller won by the Rattlers. The 2003 game stands as the largest crowd ever in the series with 73,358 in attendance.

In 2005, the game made its debut on ESPNU, the 24-hour college sports network, as a part of a commitment to broadcasting HBCU games.

Game results

Location
The game is held at Camping World Stadium in Orlando. Previous games were at the Daytona International Speedway in Daytona Beach and Doak Campbell Stadium in Tallahassee until the two schools agreed on a permanent site in Tampa in 1978.

Annual attendance
The Florida Classic has now drawn in excess of 1.8 million fans since 1978. Since 1997, a total of 1,115,783 fans have watched the Florida Classic in the Orlando Citrus Bowl Stadium, an average of 61,988 per year.  By comparison, the total attendance for the 18 years prior to Orlando was 765,529, an average of only 45,031. Between Orlando and Tampa, the Classic has drawn 1,801,587 fans. The record for attendance at the game is 73,358, set in Orlando in 2003.

Other activities

Halftime Show and Battle of the Bands
  Marching bands from both universities compete during the Florida Classic halftime show and at various events during the weekend.

In a 2006 article, Orlando Weekly Magazine said, "at most college football games, halftime is for beer runs and bathroom breaks. At the (Florida Classic), halftime is the reason to go."

Over the years fans have agreed with these types descriptions of the game's halftime show. They also point out that areas under the stadium clear out as fans go to their seats or stand on walkways located at the stadium's end zones because they provide unrestricted views of the football field and the halftime show.

Prior to the MEAC's contract with ESPN to broadcast the game, the two bands enjoyed almost unlimited time to perform their last, longest and undoubtedly best show of the year. In fact, in the 2002 Florida Classic halftime, both bands performed shows that were almost 45 minutes long, nearly tripling the halftime's allotment of only 30 minutes based on NCAA rules.

The rivalry between the two programs is also evident in phrases used by the bands' announcers. Although good friends, Horatio "In Stereo" Walker of Bethune–Cookman's Marching Wildcats and radio jockey Joe Bullard of FAMU's Marching "100," don't express any kind words for the opponent band as they narrate their marching band's respective shows.

The marching bands' appeal is also used to attract fans to other events during the Florida Classic weekend. On Fridays, both bands perform after high school bands during the annual Florida Blue Battle of the Bands at Amway Center. Prior to 2007 while Walt Disney World was still a sponsor, both bands performed annually at a parade at one of the Walt Disney World parks.

See also  
 List of NCAA college football rivalry games
 List of black college football classics

References

External links
 

College football rivalries in the United States
Bethune–Cookman Wildcats football
Florida A&M Rattlers football
Sports rivalries in Florida
Recurring sporting events established in 1978
American football in Orlando, Florida
1978 establishments in Florida